Pound Foolish: Exposing the Dark Side of the Personal Finance Industry is a 2012 book by Helaine Olen. In it Olen critiques the industry and the rise of "financial gurus".

Contents
What Hath Sylvia Wrought?
The Tao of Suze
The Latte is a Lie
Slip Slidin' Away
The Road to Pas Tina
I've Got the Horse Right Here
An Empire of Her Own
Who Wants to be a Real Estate Millionaire?
Elmo is B(r)ought to You by the Letter P
We Need to Talk About Our Money

Reception
A review of Pound Foolish by The Economist, although critical of the book's lack of an international perspective, found it an "excellent book, a contemptuous exposé of the American personal-finance industry."

The New York Times called it "a realistic and readable book", noted the "inclusion of many women's voices", and the book's criticism of "financial gurus".

Pound Foolish has also been reviewed by CBSN, Kirkus Reviews, the Journal of Financial Planning, Publishers Weekly, USA Today, The Denver Post, Booklist, and Choice.

References

External links
Library holdings of Pound Foolish
Deseret News author interview about the book

2012 non-fiction books
American non-fiction books
Finance books
Penguin Books books